Tse Ying Suet (born 9 November 1991) is a Hong Kong badminton player. She competed at the 2012 and 2016 Summer Olympics in the women's doubles event (with Poon Lok Yan). In 2012, she won the women's doubles title at the Japan Open tournament with Poon Lok Yan by beating four Japan pairs consecutively.

Tse competed at the 2020 Summer Olympics in Tokyo, held in 2021 due to the COVID-19 pandemic. Partnered with Tang Chun Man, she finished fourth in the mixed doubles, defeated by the Japanese pair Yuta Watanabe and Arisa Higashino in the bronze medal match. Tse and Cheung Ka-long were the flagbearers for the Hong Kong team at the Olympic opening ceremony.

Achievements

BWF World Championships 
Mixed doubles

Asian Games 
Mixed doubles

BWF World Junior Championships 
Girls' doubles

Asian Junior Championships 
Girls' doubles

BWF World Tour (4 titles, 1 runner-up) 
The BWF World Tour, which was announced on 19 March 2017 and implemented in 2018, is a series of elite badminton tournaments sanctioned by the Badminton World Federation (BWF). The BWF World Tours are divided into levels of World Tour Finals, Super 1000, Super 750, Super 500, Super 300 (part of the HSBC World Tour), and the BWF Tour Super 100.

Mixed doubles

BWF Superseries (2 titles, 1 runner-up) 
The BWF Superseries, which was launched on 14 December 2006 and implemented in 2007, was a series of elite badminton tournaments, sanctioned by the Badminton World Federation (BWF). BWF Superseries levels were Superseries and Superseries Premier. A season of Superseries consisted of twelve tournaments around the world that had been introduced since 2011. Successful players were invited to the Superseries Finals, which were held at the end of each year.

Women's doubles

Mixed doubles

  BWF Superseries Finals tournament
  Superseries Premier Tournament
  Superseries Tournament

BWF Grand Prix (2 titles, 7 runner-up) 
The BWF Grand Prix had two levels, the Grand Prix and Grand Prix Gold. It was a series of badminton tournaments sanctioned by the Badminton World Federation (BWF) and played between 2007 and 2017.

Women's doubles

Mixed doubles

  BWF Grand Prix Gold tournament
  BWF Grand Prix tournament

BWF International Challenge/Series (3 titles, 2 runner-up) 
Women's doubles

Mixed doubles

  BWF International Challenge tournament
  BWF International Series tournament
  BWF Future Series tournament

References

External links 
 

Living people
1991 births
Hong Kong female badminton players
Badminton players at the 2012 Summer Olympics
Badminton players at the 2016 Summer Olympics
Badminton players at the 2020 Summer Olympics
Olympic badminton players of Hong Kong
Badminton players at the 2010 Asian Games
Badminton players at the 2014 Asian Games
Badminton players at the 2018 Asian Games
Asian Games silver medalists for Hong Kong
Asian Games medalists in badminton
Medalists at the 2018 Asian Games